Daphne (minor planet designation: 41 Daphne) is a large asteroid from the asteroid belt. It is a dark-surfaced body 174 km in diameter is probably composed of primitive carbonaceous chondrites. The spectra of the asteroid displays evidence of aqueous alteration. It was discovered by H. Goldschmidt on May 22, 1856, and named after Daphne, the nymph in Greek mythology who was turned into a laurel tree.  Incorrect orbital calculations initially resulted in 56 Melete being mistaken for a second sighting of Daphne.  Daphne was not sighted again until August 31, 1862.

The orbit of 41 Daphne places it in a 9:22 mean motion resonance with the planet Mars. The computed Lyapunov time for this asteroid is 14,000 years, indicating that it occupies a chaotic orbit that will change randomly over time because of gravitational perturbations of the planets.

In 1999, Daphne occulted three stars, and on July 2, 1999, produced eleven chords indicating an ellipsoid of 213×160 km. Daphnean lightcurves also suggest that the asteroid is irregular in shape. Daphne was observed by Arecibo radar in April 2008. Based upon radar data, the near surface solid density of the asteroid is 2.4.

Satellite 

41 Daphne has at least one satellite, named Peneius (provisionally S/2008 (41) 1). It was identified on March 28, 2008, and has a projected separation of 443 km, an orbital period of approximately 1.1 days, and an estimated diameter of less than 2 km. If these preliminary observations hold up, this binary system has the most extreme size ratio known.
In Greek myth, Pēneios is the god of the river of that name, and father of Daphne.

References

External links 
 Asteroids with Satellites, Robert Johnston, johnstonsarchive.net
 
 

Background asteroids
Daphne
Daphne
Binary asteroids
C-type asteroids (Tholen)
Ch-type asteroids (SMASS)
18560522

vec:Lista de asteroidi#41 Dafne